Andrew Sincock  (born 7 June 1951) is a former first-class cricketer who played for South Australia. He was a fast bowler.

Sincock was vice captain on the Australian school boys tour of the West Indies in 1969–70.

He made his first class debut in 1974 and was the opening bowler for the 1981/82 South Australian Sheffield Shield winning team. That season he took his best figures 5-56.

After retirement he was Head Coach of the West End Redbacks and AIS Cricket Academy. Sincock was elected to the South Australian Cricket Association (SACA) Board in 2000 and was vice president in 2013. He has Degrees in Economics and Education.

References

External links

1951 births
Living people
Cricketers from South Australia